domobaal is an art gallery in John Street in Holborn in central London. It was established in 2000 in a Georgian townhouse, a former head office of a firm of lawyers, left largely unrestored. The gallery specialises in contemporary painting, sculpture, film and artists publications, having hosted over 200 exhibitions by artists including Ansel Krut, Lothar Götz, Neil Zakiewicz, David Gates, Neil Gall, Stuart Brisley, Sharon Kivland, Nicky Hirst, Haris Epaminonda, Marcel Dinahet, Maud Cotter, Alice Wilson, Emma Talbot, Ailbhe Ní Bhriain  and Walter Swennen among many others.

Notes and references

External links
 domobaal website
 Spaces: The Live/Work Gallery on art-agenda.com by Jonathan Griffin, 27.07.15
 Nicky Hirst named official artist for the 2019 General Election

Contemporary art galleries in London
Art galleries established in 2000